"Much Apu About Something" is the twelfth episode of the twenty-seventh season of the American animated television series The Simpsons, and the 586th episode of the series overall. It aired in the United States on Fox on January 17, 2016.

Plot 
Springfield is having a parade in homage to the city's founder Jebediah Springfield, where they introduce a new statue of him to a very negative reception. During the parade, Bart activates a fire engine's water cannon, soaking Chief Wiggum. As a result, the Springfield Police Department gets into a battle against the volunteer fire department which ends with a SWAT tank losing control and destroying the Kwik-E-Mart, injuring Apu and Sanjay. Homer catches video proof of Bart causing the disaster, and threatens to hand the tape over and send Bart to juvenile detention unless he swears to never pull a prank again. Milhouse tries to bring the old Bart back, but Bart resists dropping a beehive on Superintendent Chalmers' crotch and releasing the handbrake on Principal Skinner's cherry-picker. But Bart ends up doing well at school and noticing that Homer and Marge do not really praise their kids when they do well, resulting in a closer bond with his younger sister Lisa, as now he understands her disappointed past feelings.

At the hospital, Sanjay reveals that he wants to retire from his job at the Kwik-E-Mart and give his share of the store to his son Jamshed "Jay" Nahasapeemapetilon. Six weeks after the incident, Apu returns to the Kwik-E-Mart only to find it renovated into a new store, the Quick & Fresh, a store that sells natural products run by Jay. At the store's restroom, Jay explains that Apu has an addiction to scratching lottery tickets. Because of that, he is the owner of 80% of the store. Jay, who is already angry at his uncle for being a stereotype, eventually fires Apu from his job. Apu is so depressed that he goes to Moe's Tavern, where Moe convinces Homer to turn Bart into a prankster again for him to pull a prank on Jay so Apu can have his store back.

Bart, who reluctantly comes back to his old self Clockwork Orange-style, decides to turn the Quick & Fresh light switch off for thirty seconds; as none of the products have preservatives, everything will deteriorate, scaring the customers away. He is interrupted by Lisa, who reminds him that after he stopped pranking, they love each other even more. Bart misinterprets the expression "unconditional love" as a sign he can do anything he wants and still be loved by his sister, so he cuts the store's power for a few seconds. When he turns the power back on, two massage stones collide, producing a spark that leads to a major fire. As the firefighters used all their water and foam against the police officers on the parade, they have nothing they can extinguish the fire with, and the store is completely destroyed by the flames. Later, Apu apologizes to Jay for the destruction, but he also finds a The Big Bang Theory scratch-off ticket in the middle of the debris. He scratches it and thanks to three images of Sheldon Cooper wins a million dollars — enough money to buy his store back and rebuild the Kwik-E-Mart.

In the final scene, Mayor Quimby plans to have Wiggum use a tank to destroy the Jebediah Springfield statue. Wiggum fires at the statue, only for projectiles to be deflected enough to destroy the tank, much to Quimby and Wiggum's annoyance.

Reception 
"Much Apu About Something" received a 1.8 rating and was watched by 3.95 million viewers, making it Fox's highest rated show of the night.

Dennis Perkins of The A.V. Club gave the episode an A−, saying that episode, "About Apu’s nephew Jamshed (or Jay, as he prefers) turning the Kwik-E-Mart into a health food store, might reference a beloved episode about Apu’s dignity in the face of Springfield’s hairtrigger xenophobia, but it’s equally a referendum on the character of Apu Nahasapeemapetilon himself."

References

External links 

2016 American television episodes
The Simpsons (season 27) episodes